Marhanets is a city in Nikopol Raion of Dnipropetrovsk Oblast that was established in 1938 in southern Ukraine. It was established in place of the village of Horodyshche, which contained a manganese mine (mining town) and was called Komintern from 1926 to 1938. 

The city is located on the right bank of the Kakhovka Reservoir on the Dnieper River where the river meets one of its tributaries Tomakivka. Marhanets hosts the administration of Marhanets urban hromada, one of the hromadas of Ukraine.

History

It is considered that next to the modern city was located the Cossack Fort "Tomakivka Sich" in the 16th century that was destroyed by Tatars soon after the Kosiński Uprising.

During World War II, Marhanets was under German occupation from 17 August 1941 until 5 February 1944. It was administered as a part of Reichskommissariat Ukraine. The Germans operated a forced labour camp in the town.

On October 12, 2010, at least 42 people died in the Marhanets train accident.

Until 18 July 2020, Marhanets was incorporated as a city of oblast significance and the center of Marhanets Municipality. The municipality was abolished in July 2020 as part of the administrative reform of Ukraine, which reduced the number of raions of Dnipropetrovsk Oblast to seven. The area of Marhanets Municipality was merged into Nikopol Raion.

References

External links

 The first film about history of town Marhanets

Cities in Dnipropetrovsk Oblast
Zaporozhian Sich historic sites
Mining cities and regions in Ukraine
Populated places established in the Ukrainian Soviet Socialist Republic
Nikopol Raion
Populated places of Kakhovka Reservoir
Populated places on the Dnieper in Ukraine